Rajdhani may refer to:
 Rajdhani (film), 1956 Indian film
 Rajadhani (1994 film), Indian Malayalam-language film
 Rajadhani (2011 film), Indian Kannada-language film
 Rajdhani, Kotli, a village in Pakistan
 Rajdhani, Gorakhpur, a village in India
 Rajdhani Express, premium passenger train service in India
 Rajadhani Express, a railway service provider in Sri Lanka

See also
 Rajadhani (disambiguation)